Willow Creek may refer to:

Places
 Willow Creek Border Crossing, at Canada–US border

Canada
 Municipal District of Willow Creek No. 26, Alberta
 Willow Creek Provincial Park, Alberta
 Rural Municipality of Willow Creek No. 458, Saskatchewan

United States
 Willow Creek, Alaska
 Willow Creek, California
 Willow Creek, Indiana
 Willow Creek, Minnesota
 Willow Creek, Montana
 Willow Creek AVA, a California wine region 
 Willow Creek-Lurline Wildlife Management Area, northern California
 Willow Creek Pass (Colorado)
 Willow Creek Wildlife Area, Oregon
 Willow Creek Winery, a winery in New Jersey

Hydrology

 Willow Creek (Colorado), a tributary of the Colorado River
 Willow Creek (Calaveras County, California), which flows into New Hogan Lake
 Willow Creek (Lassen County, California), a tributary of the Susan River
 Willow Creek (Madera County, California), a primary inflow to Bass Lake in Madera County
 Willow Creek (New York), a tributary of Cayuga Lake in Tompkins County
 Willow Creek (Sacramento County, California), a tributary of the American River
 Willow Creek (Montana), a list of streams named Willow Creek in Montana
 Willow Creek (Long Pine Creek tributary), a stream in Brown County, Nebraska
 Willow Creek (Niobrara River tributary), a stream in Rock County, Nebraska
 Willow Creek (Goose Lake), Oregon, primary inflow to  Goose Lake on the Oregon-California border
 Willow Creek (Columbia River tributary), Oregon
 Willow Creek (Deschutes River tributary), Oregon
 Willow Creek (Grand and Uintah counties, Utah)
 Willow Creek (Jordan River tributary), Utah
 Willow Creek (Price River tributary), Utah, a tributary of the Price River
 Willow Creek Dam (Oregon)
 Willow Creek Dam (Colorado)
 Willow Creek Dam (Montana)

Other
 Willow Creek (film), a 2013 film
 Willow Creek Association, a Christian organization; 
 Willow Creek Community Church, in South Barrington, Illinois
 Willow Creek/Southwest 185th Avenue Transit Center, a light rail station in Oregon, United States
 Willow Creek, a fictional neighborhood in the life simulation video game The Sims 4